Portlandia is an American  sketch comedy television series starring Fred Armisen and Carrie Brownstein, set in and around Portland, Oregon.

Portlandia may also refer to:

Media
 Portlandia (statue), a sculpture by Raymond Kaskey

Science
 757 Portlandia, a main-belt asteroid  in diameter
 Portlandia (bivalve), a mollusk genus in the family Yoldiidae
 Portlandia (plant), a genus of flowering plants in the coffee family, Rubiaceae

See also
 Portland, Oregon

Genus disambiguation pages